The Singing Sword is a historical fiction novel written by Jack Whyte, first published in 1993. It is the second novel in the A Dream of Eagles series. Publishers Weekly described Whyte's approach to historical fiction as a "dirt-beneath-the nails version of the Arthurian "Camulod"" and praised it as "a top-notch Arthurian tale forged to a sharp edge in the fires of historical realism".

References

1993 British novels
Novels by Jack Whyte
Novels set in Roman Britain
Novels set in sub-Roman Britain
Canadian historical novels
Modern Arthurian fiction
Tor Books books
Viking Press books